Joseph A. Gilbert is a former politician from Grenada.  He served as that nation's Minister of Works, Physical Development, Public Utilities and Environment from 2008 to 2012.

Gilbert was a member of the House of Representatives of Grenada. The House of Representatives is the lower house of the Parliament of Grenada. It has 15 members, elected for a five-year term in single-seat constituencies. Gilbert was the National Democratic Congress Party member for the seat of Saint Patrick West.

References

External links
Bio and photo prepared for 2008 election, caribbeanelections.com

Year of birth missing (living people)
Living people
Members of the House of Representatives of Grenada
Caribbean Rhodes Scholars
Government ministers of Grenada
National Democratic Congress (Grenada) politicians